CelebAbility is a British game show. It began airing on 15 June 2017 on ITV2 and is presented by Iain Stirling.

Format
CelebAbility features two teams, one consisting of celebrities and the other, a group of challengers which feature members of the public. The captain of the challengers selects a member of their team to take on a celebrity in a challenge which consists of the celebrity's expert subject. Since 2019, Scarlett Moffatt has served has captain of the challengers team, except the fourth series, which featured Stacey Solomon instead, due to Moffatt having other commitments. Marek Larwood also appears in every episode as the adjudicator.

Production
In May 2017, ITV announced the commissioning of the CelebAbility, a new physical comedy entertainment game show. It is produced by Potato, the same company behind game shows such as The Chase and Ninja Warrior UK. The show is broadcast weekly on ITV2 and airs directly after Love Island.

Episodes

Series 1 (2017)

Series 2 (2018)

Series 3 (2019)

Series 4 (2020)

Series 5 (2021)

Series 6 (2022)

References

External links
 
 
 

2017 British television series debuts
2010s British game shows
2020s British game shows
2010s British reality television series
2020s British reality television series
ITV reality television shows
Television series by ITV Studios
English-language television shows